Henry Bakis is professor emeritus of geography at the University of Montpellier. His research has mainly focused on industry, firms and ICT geography (information and communications technologies).  One of his primary interests has been considering the articulation and the effects of electronic communication networks on territories and social networks.

Biography 
Bakis plays an active role in the International Geographical Union commission dedicated to ICT: executive secretary, chairman or vice-chair of the commissions dedicated to ICT (1985 - 2016).
He founded and edited the Communication Newsletter Geography (1985 - 2000)   and the journal Netcom (1987) on communication and territories.

Bakis was a researcher at the French CNET  from 1978 to 1995. He was associated research director at Paris-Sorbonne University from 1991 to 1996; and professor of economic geography at the University of Montpellier (1996-2015).

Scope of work

Multinationals, technology and spatial organization
During the 1970s Bakis studied the consequences of industrial policies, industrial subcontracting and multinational firms activities in the French regions (IBM Case study). He then turned his attention to telecommunications networks of large enterprises first from the IBM case. 
More generally, the relationship between organizations, network technologies and geographical space are the center of his analysis. He "has contributed greatly to promote this approach of the geography, both within French geographers as within the International Geographical Union.".

Geography of ICT
Since the end of the 1970s Bakis calls for the study of telecommunications, ICT systems and digital network technologies from the geographical point of view. He "did pioneering work through important scientific production". For Bakis, telecommunications is "one of the levers of regional planning to open up the territories, improve economic performance, and allow various forms of teleactivities, a new connection between the local and the global level". He worked on the digital development of territories following the development of the Internet and digital infrastructures.

Spatial heterogeneity
The work of Bakis demonstrates that ICT does not lead to the "death of distance", or "the end of geography " in spite of the assertions of some futurologists as Richard O'Brien, Frances Cairncross, Kenichi Ohmae. 
ICT would minimize the importance of geographical locations, the development of networks but simultaneously  leads to greater spatial heterogeneity with enhanced polarization and metropolisation. The development of infrastructure networks is closely related to demographic, social and economic pre-existing  environment. Bakis dismissed the unfounded  hopes of positive spatial effects. Bakis wrote that despite the development of infrastructure and communications services "space continues to be differentiated and this is one of the reasons why networks are heterogeneous".

He pleads also for the development of electro-sensitive fog free areas  (implementation of the precautionary principle).

Geocybergeography
Bakis is considered as the "inventor of the concept of geocybergeography".  He considers that human beings still live in a geographical classical space but this space is modified by the use of ICT.  Today, it includes new attributes making it more complex.
The cyberspace of electronic communication does not substitute nor overlap classical space; instead, it comes to mingle closely with the later at all scales. Bakis termed geocyberspace this contemporary form of geographic space in which are modified: the distance (apparent reduction), time (ubiquitous for some services) and costs.

Geopolitics of information
Bakis geopolitical approach to communications networks has focused on the role of technology and new technical networks in the changing cultural and political contexts for populations from recent migrations or from older diasporas, and for cultural, ethnic or religious minorities. Identities of all kind of minorities can be maintained and strengthened in the Internet age. Electronic communication networks disrupt the concepts of distance.

Main publications
For a full list see Mommolin S. (2018), "Bibliography of the Publications of Professor Henry Bakis: 1972-2018", NETCOM, p. 217-252, https://journals.openedition.org/netcom/3066

Books
 BAKIS H. (1977),IBM Une multinationale régionale, Presses Universitaires de Grenoble, Grenoble
 BAKIS H. (1978), La photographie aérienne et spatiale et la télédétection, Presses Universitaires de France (PUF), Que sais-je?, Paris.   
 BAKIS H. et GUGLIELMO Raymond (1979), La pétrochimie dans le monde, PUF, Que sais-je?, Paris. 
 BAKIS H. (1984), Géographie des télécommunications,  PUF, Que sais-je?, Paris.  
 BAKIS H. (1987), Géopolitique de l'information, PUF, Que sais-je?, Paris.   
 BAKIS H. (1988), Entreprise, espace, télécommunication. Nouvelles technologies de l'information et organisation de l'espace économique,  Paradigme, Caen, 253 p. 
 BAKIS H. (Ed., 1988), Information et organisation spatiale, Paradigme, Caen, 236 p.
 BAKIS H. (Ed., 1990), Communications et territoires, La Documentation française, 404 p., Paris. 
 BAKIS H. (1993), Les réseaux et leurs enjeux sociaux, PUF, Que sais-je?, Paris.   
 BAKIS H., ABLER Ronald & ROCHE Edward M. (Ed., 1993), Corporates networks, international telecommunications and interdependence. Perspectives from geography and information systems, Belhaven Press (Pinter), London, 232 p.
 VLEUGEL Jaap M. (author), NIJKAMP Peter (author, editor),  BAKIS Henry (contributor)  (1994), Missing transport networks in Europe,   Akdershot, Brookfield, Avebury, xi, 203 p : ill; 23 cm; Bibliogr.: p. 188-203; 
 BAKIS H. et DUPUY Gabriel (Eds., 1995), 'Réseaux de communication', Annales de géographie, n° 585-586, pp. 451–621
 BAKIS H. (Editor, 1995), 'Communication and Political Geography in a Changing World', Revue Internationale de Science Politique, vol. 16, n° 3,  pp. 219–311, Elsevier S. Ltd, Oxford, https://www.jstor.org/stable/i272314
 BAKIS H., HOTTES Kalheinz & WEBER Hans-Ulrich (Editors, 1995), 'Telecommunications and  emerging spatial and economic organisation', Materialen zur Raumordnung, 47, Bochum, 131 p.
 BAKIS H. (1995), 'Télécommunications  et   quartiers    défavorisés', NETCOM,  vol. 9, n° H. S., 627 p.
 ROCHE Edward M. & BAKIS H. (Editors, 1997), Developments in telecommunications. Between global and local, Avebury, 350 p.  
 BAKIS H. et BONIN Muriel (2000), La photographie aérienne et spatiale. PUF, Que sais-je ?, Paris.  
 BAKIS H. & HUH Woo-kung (Editors, 2001),  'Geocyberspace : Building Territories on the Geographical Space of the 21st Century', Netcom, Vol. 15, n° 1-2, pp. 3–153 et vol. 16 (2002), n° 1-2, pp. 3–83
 BAKIS Henry (Ed. 2001), 'Réseaux de Télécommunications. Réseaux sociaux', Bulletin de l'Association de Géographes français, Géographies,   78ème année, n°1, pp. 1–47
 BAKIS Henry (Ed. 2005), 'Information technologies: from physical networks to digital communities', NETCOM, Vol. 19, No 1-2 
 BAKIS Henry, PARADISO Maria, VIDAL Philippe (Editors 2007), 'Geocyberspace : uses and perspective', NETCOM, Vol. 21, No 3-4, pp. 281–430
 BAKIS Henry (Ed. 2011), 'New digital uses and territories', NETCOM, Vol. 25, No 1-2, pp. 1–128   
 BAKIS Henry (Ed. 2012), 'Digital Territories: Case Studies', NETCOM, Vol. 26, No 3-4, pp. 145–402  
 BAKIS Henry (Ed. 2013), 'The Geopolitics of Digital Space', NETCOM, Vol. 27, No 3-4, pp. 287–460

Translations from French
 BAKIS H. (1980), The communications of larger firms and their implications on the emergence of a new world industrial order. A case study: I.B.M.'s global data network, Contributing report. Meeting of the IGU Commission on Industrial Systems (26–30 August), ChuoUniversity, Tokyo, 105 p
 BAKIS H. (1982), 'Elements for a geography of telecommunication', Geographical Research Forum, n° 4, pp. 31–45, https://web.archive.org/web/20131009032918/http://www.geog.bgu.ac.il/grf/full-text/Vol4/BakisH.pdf
 BAKIS H. (1982), IBM, una multinazionale régionale,  198 p. Intr. Pasquale Coppola. Franco Angeli, Collana Geogrfia umana, Milano
 BAKIS H. (1986), 'Telecommunication and localisation of activities within firms',  Chap. 2 in HOTTES Karleinz, WEVER Egbert, WEBER Hans-Ulrich (Editors), Technology and Industrial Change in Europe, Materialen, zur Raumordnung, Bochum, pp. 10–17
 BAKIS H. (1987), 'Geografia delle telecomunicazioni' pp. 8–69, in Telecomunicazioni e territorio : contributi per un analisi geografica ed economica delle reti e dei servizi di telecomunicazione, Cooperativa di cultura Lorenzo Milani
 BAKIS H. (1989), Geografia del potere : l'informazione nelle strategie internazionali, Ulisse Edizioni (Turin) et Nuova Ulisse (Bologne), 128 pp., collezione Test, 
 BAKIS H. (1991), 'Telecomunicaciones espacio y tiempo', in GOMEZ MONT Carmen (Ed.), Nuevas tecnologias de comunicacion, Editorial Trillas, Mexico, pp. 49–60
 BAKIS H. & LU Zi (2000), 'The Change from the Geographical Space to Geocyberspace.  Review on the Western Scholars on Regional Effects by Telecommunications',    ACTA Geographica Sinica, Vol.55, No.1, pp 104–111 (Chinese)

Journals, papers and book chapters 
 BAKIS H. (1975), 'La sous-traitance dans l'industrie', Annales de Géographie, Paris, pp. 297–317
 BAKIS H. (1975), 'Téléinformatique et disparités régionales en France', L'Espace Géographique, n° 2, pp. 141–148
 BAKIS H. (1987), 'Telecommunications and the Global Firm', in HAMILTON F.E.I. (ed),  Industrial change in advanced economies , Croom Helm, London, 1987, pp. 130–160
 BAKIS H. (1988), 'Technopole et téléport: concepts et réalités',  Problèmes économiques , n° 2082, 6 juillet 1988, pp. 12–19
 BAKIS H. (1993), 'Economic and Social Geography- Toward the integration of communication networks studies', pp. 1–16 in BAKIS H., ABLER Ronald & ROCHE Edward M. (editors, 1993),  Corporates networks, international telecommunications and interdependence. Perspectives from geography and information systems , Belhaven, London, 232 p.
 BAKIS H. (1996), 'L'évolution du métier de géographe et les télécommunications. Défis et opportunités pour l'Union Géographique Internationale',  International Geographical Union bulletin, 46,  pp. 58–62
 BAKIS H. (1996), « Cultures, électronique et territoires »,  Netcom , vol. 10, n°2, pp. 640–664.
 BAKIS H., ROCHE Edward M. (1997), 'Cyberspace- The Emerging Nervous System of Global Society and its Spatial Functions', pp. 1– 12, in ROCHE E. M. & BAKIS H. (Editors, 1997), Developments in telecommunications. Between global and local, Avebury (Aldershot UK, Brookfield USA, Hong Kong, Singapore, Sydney), 350 p.  
 BAKIS H. et ROCHE Edward M. (1998), 'Cyberspace – The Emerging Nervous System of Global Society and its Spatial Functions',   CYBERGEO , No. 59, mai, www.cybergeo.presse.fr/reseaux/texte1/bakis2.htm
 BAKIS H. et ROCHE Edward M. (2000), 'Geography, Technology and Organization', Chap. 4, in ROCHE Edward Mozley, BLAINE Michael James (Editors),  Information technology in Multinational Enterprises , Coll. New Horizons in International Business, Edward Elgard Publishing Ltd., Cheltenham UK, Northampton MA USA, pp. 125– 152. Bibliogr: 299-333.
 BAKIS H. (2001), 'Understanding the geocyberspace : a major task for geographers and planners in the next decade', Netcom, vol.  15, n° 1-2, pp. 9–16
 BAKIS H. (2007), 'Les nouveaux territoires de l'identité. Minorités et Internet',  Netcom , vol. 21, n° 3/4,  pp. 381–384, http://netcom.revues.org/2266; DOI : 10.4000/netcom.2266
 BAKIS H. (2007),'The geocyberespace revisited : uses and perspectives', NETCOM Vol. 21, N° 3-4, pp. 285–296, (PDF)
 BAKIS H. (2007), « Les nouveaux territoires de l'identité. Minorités et Internet », Note de recherche, Netcom, vol. 21, n°3-4, pp. 381–384. 
 BAKIS H.,  VIDAL Philippe (2010), 'Geography of the Information Society', Ch. 5, pp. 71–87, in REBER Bernard &  BROSSAUD Claire (eds.), 'Digital Cognitive Technologies. Epistemology and Knowledge Society,  ISTE /Wiley
 BAKIS H. (2013), 'Fragilité du géocyberespace à l'heure des conflits cybernétiques',  Netcom , vol. 27, n° 3/4, pp. 293–308, https://netcom.revues.org/1438 
 BAKIS H. (2016), 'Pour l'aménagement d'espaces sans brouillard électromagnétique', in Paché Gilles, El Khayat Mustapha (2016), Invitation aux flux. Entre transport et espace, Coll. Travail et Gouvernance, Presses Universitaire de Provence, pp. 143–150.

Video
 BAKIS H. (2010), 'TIC et Développement numérique des territoires'. Conférence d'ouverture des Journées DigiPolis. Territoires numériques intelligents, Montbéliard, 26 mai. (vidéo 30 minutes) http://www.digipolis.fr/2010/digipolis/digipolis-tv/seancedouverture.html

Other
 "Liste de publications de H. Bakis (1972-2015)", Université Paul-Valéry Montpellier 3, http://hbgeo.upv.univ-montp3.fr/bibliographie/henry-bakis-publications/
  Mommolin Sabrina (2018), « Bibliographie thématique des publications du Professeur Henry Bakis : 1972-2018 » / "Bibliography of the Publications of Professor Henry Bakis: 1972-2018", NETCOM,  https://journals.openedition.org/netcom/3066

References 
 Autrement  (1990), 'Info-révolution', n° spécial de la revue, Paris, p. 215 
 Boulanger Philippe (2013), "Pour une géopolitique des médias", La revue européenne des medias, N°26-27 http://la-rem.eu/2013/03/21/pour-une-geopolitique-des-medias/ 21 mars.
 Cassé Marie-Claude (1995), « Réseaux de télécommunications et production de territoire », in Sciences de la société, n° 35, pp. 61–81 (see pp. 64, 73, 79)
 Cassé Marie-Claude (1995), 'Réseaux de télécommunications et construction territoriale', in R. Ferras & D. Pumain (dir. 1995), Encyclopédie de la géographie, Economica, pp. 1021–1039 (see pp. 1031, 1033, 1037)
 Chéneau-Loquay Annie   (2010), 'Quelle géographie des TIC dans les espaces en développement ?',  in Christian Bouquet (Ed.),  Les géographes et le développement, discours et actions , pp. 213–233, MSHA Bordeaux.  (see p. 1). 
 Claval Paul (1995), « Les problématiques géographiques de la communication », Sciences de la société, n° 35, mai, pp. 31–46  (see pp. 41–42)
 De Fornel, Michel (1987), compte rendu de ″Géopolitique de l'information″, Réseaux, n° 25, p. 14.  https://www.persee.fr/doc/reso_0751-7971_1987_num_5_25_1264
 Di Méo, Guy (1995), ″Des réseaux partout: Bakis (H.), Les réseaux et leurs enjeux sociaux [compte-rendu]″, Annales de Géographie, tome 104, n°585-586, p. 617, https://www.persee.fr/issue/geo_0003-4010_1995_num_104_585 
 Doucet Fréderik and Desforges Alix (2018), "Du cyberespace à la datasphère. Le nouveau front pionnier de la géographie", Netcom, vol. 32, n0 1-2, https://journals.openedition.org/netcom/3419 
Duféal Marina and Vidal Philippe (2018), « Sur le numérique territorial, sur son histoire et sur ses prolongements », Netcom, 32-1/2 | 2018, 05-08. URL: http://journals.openedition.org/netcom/3393 
 Duféal Marina and Vidal Philippe (editors, 2018), 'Geographic explorations in digital lands, pioneering frontiers and new limits - A tribute to Henry Bakis'/ Expéditions géographiques en Terres Numériques, fronts pionniers et nouvelles limites - Hommage à Henry Bakis', Netcom, 32-1/2, 254 p.,  https://journals.openedition.org/netcom/3312 
 Dupuy Gabriel (2000), Book review:  Bakis H. et Segui Pons J.M. (Ed.), 'Géospace et cyberspace', Annales de Géographie, vol. 109, n° 612, p. 218. 
 Eveno Emmanuel (2004), 'La géographie de la société de l'information: entre abîmes et sommets', Netcom, vol. 18, n°1-2, pp. 11–87. 
 Eveno Emmanuel (2004), 'Le paradigme territorial de la société de l'information', "Netcom", vol. 18, n°1-2, pp. 89–134. 
 George Pierre (1978), Book review: 'Compte rendu de : H. Bakis, La photographie aérienne et spatiale''', Annales de Géographie, volume 87, n° 484, p. 710 
 Hottes Karlheinz & Peter Graef (1998): 'Research group 17: Geography of communication and telecommunication – Development, activities and ambitions 1984-1998', Aachen, https://web.archive.org/web/20131224225558/http://www.diegeo.rwth-aachen.de/?id=938&L=1 
 Hottes Karlheinz (1987), ' The impact of Telematics… ' in 'Les espaces de la communication', Bulletin de l'Idate, Montpellier, n° 26, 1r tr. 1987, pp. 171–187 (p. 182)
 IdRef, Le référenciel des autorités sudoc. « Henry Bakis », http://www.idref.fr/026701634#300  
 Kellerman Aharon and Wilson Mark I., « A tribute to the IGU activities of Professor Henry Bakis », Netcom, 32-1/2 | 2018, 209-210. URL : http://journals.openedition.org/netcom/2989  
 Méndez Ricardo (1997), Geografia economica, La logica espacial des capitalismo global, Ariel Geografia, Barcelona, 385 p.  (see pp. 202; 265, 364).
 Mommolin Sabina (2018), ″Bibliographie thématique des publications du Professeur Henry Bakis : 1972-2018″, Netcom, https://journals.openedition.org/netcom/3066 
 Moriset Bruno (2000), "Quelles problématiques pour les technologies de l'information et de la communication en milieu rural?", in Géocarrefour, "Espaces ruraux et technologie de l'information", 75-1  pp. 5–6.
 Offner Jean-Marc (1994), Book review:   Les réseaux et leurs enjeux sociaux, in  Flux, n° 17, pp. 57–58. 
 Paré Suzanne (1978), Book review: "Compte rendu de I.B.M., une multinationale régionale", Annales de Géographie, vol.   87, n° 483, pp. 576–577. http://www.persee.fr/web/revues/home/prescript/article/geo_0003-4010_1978_num_87_483_19834_t1_0576_0000_1 
 Robic M.-C., Briend A.-M., Rössler M. (dir. 1996),  Géographes face au monde. L'Union géographique internationale et les congrès internationaux de géographie. Paris, L'Harmattan, 1996, 464 p. (pp. 352–353)  
 Santos Milton (1997), La nature de l'espace: technique et temps, raison et émotion'', L'Harmattan, Paris, pp. 189–190
 University Paul-Valéry Montpellier 3 - Thesis directed by H. Bakis : http://hbgeo.upv.univ-montp3.fr/bibliographie/direction-de-theses/
 Vidal Philippe (2018), « Henry Bakis, défricheur de la géographie des télécommunications », Netcom, 32-1/2 | 2018, 09-28. URL : http://journals.openedition.org/netcom/3286

External links 
 CiNii (Scholarly and Academic Information Navigator database service, Japan)- ID: DA01435949; http://ci.nii.ac.jp/books/author?count=20&sortorder=2&name=BAKIS+Henry; http://ci.nii.ac.jp/author/DA01435949 
 Géographie des télécommunications on French Wikipedia
 Netcom website
 Netcom on French Wikipedia
 http://hbgeo.upv.univ-montp3.fr 
 WorldCat Identities, http://www.worldcat.org/identities/lccn-n82-99000

Notes

1949 births
French geographers
Living people